Jamal Jahan (also Romanized as Jamāl Jahān) is a village in Tashan-e Gharbi Rural District, Tashan District, Behbahan County, Khuzestan Province, Iran. At the 2006 census, its population was 116, in 18 families.

References 

Populated places in Behbahan County